Pajsijević (Serbian Cyrillic: Пајсијевић) is a Serbian village, located in the municipality of Knić, in the district of Šumadija. In 2002, it had 545 inhabitants.

External links 
 Satellite view of Pajsijević

Šumadija
Populated places in Šumadija District